Laotian society is a society characterized by semi-independent rural villages engaged in subsistence agricultural production. Ethnic, geographic, and ecological differences create variations in the pattern of village life from one part of the country to another, but the common threads of village self reliance, limited regional trade and communication, and identification with one's village and ethnic group persist regardless of the setting. Rural trade networks, however, have been a part of life since the 1950s. Except near the larger towns and in the rich agricultural plains of Vientiane and Savannakhét, villages are spaced at least several kilometers apart and the intervening land variously developed as rice paddy and swidden fields or maintained as buffer forest for gathering wild plants and animals, fuelwood, and occasional timber harvest.

Ethnicity differentiates the villages but is usually not a source of conflict or antagonism. Nearly all villages are ethnically homogeneous, although a few include two or more distinct groups. Ethnic mixing often has resulted from different groups migrating to a new settlement site at about the same time, or a larger village at a crossroads or river transit point developing into a minor trading center. Ethnic identity is never absolutely immutable. Some minority Laotian individuals have adopted lowland Lao behavior and dress patterns, or intermarried with lowland Lao, and have effectively acculturated to lowland society. In some units, military service has also brought together Laotians of different ethnic groups, both before and after 1975.

Since 1975, there has been more sense of national unity among most rural villagers. Precolonial governments depended more on a system of control at the district level with the chao muang (district chief) maintaining his own allegiance and tribute to the state. Administrative practices under the French and during the post-World War II period were confined primarily to provincial and a few district centers. The government was able to extract taxes with some facility but had little impact on the daily lives or thoughts of most villagers. However, since 1975, the government has expended considerable energy and resources on national unification, so that even isolated villages recognize the role of local government and consider themselves at some level to be part of a Laotian state.

Lowland Lao society

Lao Loum (Laotian of the valley), have been the dominant group- -numerically, politically, and economically—since the founding of the Kingdom of Lan Xang in the fourteenth century. The Lao of the Lao Loum ethnic group comprise just over 50 percent of the total population. Other related lowland groups include the Lue and Phu Thai, who together make up an additional 15% of the population. Groups such as the Tai Dam and Tai Deng are included by government statistics in the general category Phu Thai despite linguistic and cultural differences from other lowland groups. Variations occur regionally and among different ethnic subgroups, but the general patterns are relatively uniform. Most officials in the RLG were Lao Loum, and despite increases in the number of minority officials in the government, the lowland Lao held a clear majority in the early 1990s. Lowland cultural patterns are frequently considered the norm in designing policy or setting development priorities.

Lao Loum traditionally live in stable independent villages situated near lowland rivers or streams. At higher elevations, villages are located in valley areas that give as much access as possible to land suitable for paddy rice cultivation. Villages are self-contained and range from around twenty to over 200 households, although they typically contain forty or fifty houses and 200 to 300 people. Usually, villages are separated by rice fields or unused land. In rural areas, there might be five kilometers or more between villages, whereas in more densely populated areas only one kilometer or less separates the settlements. Most villages have grown in population over time, and if good land becomes scarce in the vicinity, it is not uncommon for some families to migrate to another area, either individually or as a group. Individual households usually move to another village where the family has kin or friends, but larger groups have often migrated to unsettled areas. Such village fission or relocation continued into the early 1990s, although migrants had to obtain permission from the district administration before settling in a new site.

The traditional independence and relative isolation of lowland villages has been reduced since the late 1980s. Although commerce in forest products—for example, sticklac—dates to colonial times, as roads have improved and marketing networks expanded, the government has encouraged commercial production for trade and export. As long as the open economic policies of the New Economic Mechanism are operating, the process of integrating lowland villages into a national socioeconomic system will likely continue.

Lao Loum houses are built on wooden piles with the floor from one to two-and one-half meters above the ground. This style keeps the living area above the mud of the rainy season, provides a shady area under the house to work or rest during the day, and allows the house to catch breezes for natural cooling. Depending on the wealth and resources of the family, the walls and floor may be made of woven split bamboo or sawn wood; the roof is constructed from grass thatch, bamboo, wood shingles, or corrugated steel roofing sheet. Some older houses in well-off villages are roofed with clay tiles, but this style was no longer common in the early 1990s. A separate rice granary is built in the house compound, also on posts using similar construction. Livestock is sometimes kept under the house.

Houses commonly range from five by seven meters to eight by twelve meters, with the smallest size typical of a newly established household or a family that has recently moved. Most houses are built with a porch on the long side that is used for visiting and as a public area. The interior is divided into one or two sleeping rooms, a common room for visiting and eating, and a separate kitchen area or side porch. Household furnishings are simple: mats or mattresses and blankets for sleeping on the floor, a low woven bamboo and rattan table for eating, and a few pots and dishes for cooking and eating. Lao Loum sit on the floor and eat from common bowls of soup or other dishes. Steamed rice is distributed among two or three common baskets placed around the edge of the table.

Lao Loum households average between six and eight persons, but may reach twelve or so in exceptional cases. The family structure is typically nuclear or stem: a married couple and their unmarried children, or an older married couple together with one married child and his or her spouse plus unmarried children and grandchildren. Because kinship is reckoned bilaterally and flexibly, Lao Loum may maintain close social relationships with kin who are only distantly related by blood. Terms of address for persons in an older generation distinguish whether the relationship is through the father's or mother's side and elder from younger siblings.

Marriage occurs through a blend of traditional and modern practices. In earlier generations, marriages may have been arranged by the families, but at least since the 1960s, most couples usually have made their own choice, which is communicated to the parents. A bride-price is negotiated, which often defrays the expenses of the wedding. The wedding takes place at the home of the bride's family, with whom the couple initially resides either in the same house or nearby. The groom helps with farming in the bride's family for several years until the couple feels they are economically ready to establish a separate household. Even then, they may continue to farm jointly with the older generation and either divide the harvest or eat from a common granary. A bride may sometimes move into her husband's household, but uxorilocal residence is somewhat more common. Initial uxorilocal residence combined with the sequential establishment of separate households by each older sibling frequently leaves the youngest daughter and her husband to care for the aged parents and ultimately to inherit the house. All the children divide lands and other valuables.

Polygyny is traditionally allowed but uncommon since the LPDR government outlawed it shortly after coming to power. Further, having multiple wives generally was restricted to the elite because it required the ability to maintain a larger household. However, many men have mistresses. Divorce may be initiated by either party. If a couple encounters domestic difficulties, the two families usually address the problem first. If necessary, the village elders join the attempt to resolve the couple's differences and achieve a reconciliation. After a divorce, both husband and wife may return to their families of birth, unless either can make a living other than from farming. Children of divorce may remain with either parent. In the case of a spouse's death, the widow or widower may return to their natal household but more commonly maintain an independent household or remarry. The choice often hinges on the ages of children; if none are old enough to help in the fields, the family has a difficult time surviving without extra help.

The lowland Lao village economy is centered on paddy rice cultivation, and most village activities and daily life revolve around rice production. Glutinous, or sticky rice is the staple food; because it has a high starch content, sticky rice must be steamed rather than boiled. It is eaten with the fingers and dipped in soup or a vegetable or meat dish. Most Lao Loum villages are self-sufficient in rice production, although the production of individual households within a village varies. Household work centers on paddy production from the beginning of the rains in May through December when all the rice has been brought to storage. Periods of intense work occur at the time of transplanting and harvesting, and cooperative work groups are often organized among several families to help get the tasks completed in a timely manner.

Where level terrain is inadequate, lowland Lao also practice swidden rice farming. This method is less efficient than paddy rice cultivation, which provides higher and more stable yields for less work. In certain villages, swidden rice is grown only in some years as a supplement to paddy rice production, whereas in others it is planted regularly in small quantities. Some Lao Loum villages have no land suitable for rice paddies and are completely dependent on swidden rice production. Newly established villages may first clear fields and plant swidden rice for a year or two before plowing and bunding the fields to convert them to paddies.

In addition to paddy rice, most households also have a small vegetable garden and some fruit trees, either in the house compound or near a stream or other water source. Other crops include cotton, tobacco, and sugarcane, but they are usually planted only in small quantities for personal use. Villagers also raise chickens, ducks, and pigs, as well as a buffalo or two for plowing the fields and perhaps a pair of cattle for pulling a cart. In general, rural households are largely self-sufficient, growing their own food, making their own tools and clothes, and trading any surplus for soap, kerosene, medicines, and kitchen or household goods.

Hunting, fishing, and gathering traditionally play an important role in the household economy, although as the population has increased and wild areas have been degraded, access to these resources has gradually deteriorated. Homemade rifles are used to hunt small deer, wild pigs, and small game such as squirrels and birds; fish are caught with a variety of nets, traps, or hooks. Bamboo shoots, mushrooms, fruit, medicinal or culinary roots, and leaves are gathered in the forest according to the season. Men hunt and fish with throw nets and hooks, while women fish with dip nets and baskets and collect roots and wild vegetables.

Household tasks are typically divided according to gender, but the divisions are not rigid, and men and women often perform tasks interchangeably. For example, both sexes cut and carry firewood. Women and children traditionally carry water for household use and to cultivate kitchen gardens. Women do most of the cooking, household cleaning, and washing and serve as primary caretakers for small children. They are the main marketers of surplus household food and other petty production, and women are usually the commercial marketers for vegetables, fruit, fish, poultry, and basic household dry goods. Men typically market cattle, buffalo, or pigs and are responsible for the purchase of any mechanical items. Intrafamily decision making usually requires discussions between husband and wife, but the husband usually acts as the family representative in village meetings or other official functions. In farming work, men traditionally plow and harrow the rice fields, while women uproot the seedlings before transplanting them. Both sexes transplant, harvest, thresh, and carry rice.

Occupational specialization in the village is low; virtually everyone is a rice farmer first. Some villagers may have special skills in weaving, blacksmithing, or religious knowledge, but these skills are supplementary to the fundamental task of growing enough rice and vegetables for the family. Social and economic stratification tends to be low within any one village, although villages may differ substantially one from another. Status accrues to age, wealth, skill in specific tasks, and religious knowledge. Factions based on kinship or political alliance may exist in a village but usually do not obstruct overall village cooperation and governance.

Traditionally, lowland Lao villages are led by a village chief (pho ban or nai ban) and one or two assistants who are elected by the villagers, although district or province officials sometimes use their positions to influence the results. Respected elders, including women, form an advisory group that deliberates intravillage disputes. Since 1975 villages have been governed by an administrative committee headed by a village president (pathan ban) and several other persons with responsibilities for such specific areas as economic and population records, self-defense militia, agriculture, women's affairs, and youth affairs. All members are in principle elected by popular vote, although for about a decade after 1975, party cadres at the village level were supposed to have taken an active role to ensure that acceptable candidates were selected.

Even under the present political system, however, village leaders have little or no formal authority and govern through consensus and the use of social pressure to ensure conformity. Village meetings are held infrequently but are usually well attended with different viewpoints on issues expressed openly. If a consensus on an issue is not reached, leaders will delay decisions to allow further discussion outside the meeting with all members of the community. Typical issues might include whether to build or expand a village school or dig a community well, or how to organize the annual ceremony for the village protective spirit. Historically, religious and ceremonial activities and ties with the Buddhist temple or monastery (wat) have been very important in village life and a focus of considerable time and expenditure.

Each family contributes equal amounts of labor, material, and money to village projects. Once a decision is made to undertake a project, a committee is appointed to manage the details and keep track of the contributions to ensure that everyone does his or her share. Systems of rotating labor groups for village projects are common; for example, groups of ten households may supply one worker per household every three to seven days, depending on the number of groups, until the project is finished. Some large projects, such as building a school, may continue for several years, with work taking place during the dry season when farming tasks are not heavy or when funds are available to purchase materials.

Households also cooperate informally, especially in agricultural work. Labor exchange occurs for almost every task associated with rice farming, although it is most common for transplanting, harvesting, and threshing. There are two different patterns of farm exchange. In central and southern Laos, villagers call on many other households, sometimes the entire village, for one day's help to complete a specific task such as transplanting. No specific repayment is required, but the family is obligated to help others in the village if they are unable to finish work in time. In northern villages, mutual assistance is organized on the basis of exchanges between families that should even out over the year; a day's work transplanting may be repaid by a day's work threshing. The contributions of men, women, and children over sixteen are considered equal, regardless of the task.

Houses are typically built by hand using local materials, and once the householder has collected enough wood, bamboo, and/or thatching grass, he will ask his neighbors and relatives to assist in the house raising. It usually takes twenty people a day or two to assemble the frame and raise the heavy timbers. Once the heavy work is completed, the owners finish construction over the ensuing weeks. In this work as well as farm labor exchange, the host family provides a meal to all those coming to help. For common farm work, the meal is relatively simple and usually includes a chicken or duck and a bottle of local rice liquor. For a house raising, the meal is more elaborate—a pig or small ox and considerably more liquor after the task is done. Illness, death, or other household emergencies also elicit help from one's neighbors.

Lowland Lao are almost all Buddhists, and most villages have a wat, which serves as both a social and religious center. Whereas small villages may have only one or two monks in residence plus a few novice monks, larger villages may have up six monks plus novices. Many villagers assemble at the wat for prayers on the days of each lunar quarter; on days of major religious festivals, they carry out more elaborate ceremonies and may organize a boun (religious fair) at the wat. Before the development of a national education system, boys and young men received basic religious and secular education at the wat. The wat is frequently used as a place for village meetings, because the hall is often the only building large enough to accommodate everyone at once. Most villages have a small wat committee to oversee the maintenance of the building, organization of the fair, and the general welfare of the monks and novices. The committee members are selected by consensus on the basis of their morality and religious sincerity and usually have been monks at some time in their lives.

Although they are Buddhists, Lao Loum also respect the power of phi (spirits), which may be associated with a place or a deceased person. More important for village organization is the cult of a village protective deity, or phi ban, which is typically celebrated yearly. Many villages have abandoned this practice in the face of increased modernization and official discouragement by the government. However, some villages continued through the early 1990s to offer an annual sacrifice to the phi ban in a ceremony that both reaffirmed the importance of the village as a unique social unit and aimed to secure the continued good fortune of the village and its inhabitants.

Midland Lao society
Lao Theung (Laotian of the mountain slopes), make up about 24 percent of the population and consist of at least thirty-seven different ethnic groups ranging in population from nearly 400,000—the Kammu—to fewer than 100—the Numbri. Many of the groups have additional members in Thailand or Vietnam. Of the three main ethnic classifications, the differences among the Lao Theung groups are greater than among the Lao Loum or Lao Sung. Little is known about many of these groups, and reasonably complete ethnographic accounts are available only for a few. Most Lao Theung groups reside in a relatively limited geographic area; for example, the Nyaheun, Sedang, and Larvae mostly live in the far southern provinces of Attapu and Saravan (Salavan), whereas the Lamet reside near the border between Bokeo, Oudômxai, and Louang Namtha provinces. The Kammu live scattered throughout the north, from Xiangkhoang to Bokeo.

The Lao Theung speak languages of the Austroasiatic family, and although some languages are closely related, such as Kammu, Lamet, and Sam Tao, others are mutually incomprehensible. None of the languages has developed a written script. The geographer Christian Taillard has suggested that the Lao Theung were originally paddy rice farmers displaced by Tai migrants into the hills and mountains and forced to turn to swidden rice production. However, Karl Gustav Izikowitz's ethnography of the Lamet reports that historically they had been swidden farmers and did not cultivate paddy rice even in areas where suitable land was available. Certainly within the last two centuries, all the Lao Theung have been characterized as swidden farmers and as semimigratory because they have occasionally relocated their villages as swidden areas were exhausted. The Kammu and Lamet, who are found in northern Laos, have different social organization and agricultural ecology than the ethnic groups in southern Laos.

Most Lao Theung villages (based primarily on descriptions of the Kammu) are located on mountain slopes but not at the peaks or ridges—the name Lao Theung means roughly "the Lao up there." Since the 1950s, however, a growing number of villages have been established at lower elevations near rivers or roads, which occurred as roads were beginning to be rebuilt and expanded. Sometimes these villages were founded by people fleeing the war, and sometimes they arose out of a desire to be closer to transportation, markets, and social services. After 1975 many Hmong and some Kammu were driven out by the Pathet Lao and the Lao People's Army.
Since the 1980s, the government has encouraged upland swidden farming minoritys to relocate to lowland areas in order to reduce upland swidden farming and forest clearing. Kammu and Lamet villages, as well as those of some other midland groups, are relatively permanent, some remaining over fifty years in a location. Traditionally, villages managed the rotation of swidden fields in such a way as to sustain agricultural production over long periods. Individual households might move from a village to another location, or villages might merge with a second village being established a short distance away; however, the usual pattern was sedentary. Midland groups inhabiting central Laos generally have been more mobile, with villages relocated after a decade or so. However, it is not clear whether this is a long- standing pattern or a response to the unsettled conditions during the Second Indochina War.

Lao Theung villages are usually somewhat smaller than most Lao Loum villages, commonly ranging between twenty and thirty households, but sites with fifty households and 300 or more inhabitants have been reported. Houses in Lamet and Kammu villages are clustered without apparent organization or orientation, but individual sites are selected with the advice of a village spirit practitioner. Lamet villages are commonly divided into two segments by the men's common house centrally located in the village, but a similar practice has not been recorded for the Kammu. Traditionally, in Kammu households, there is a separate common house for adolescent boys and strangers, but this practice has not been continued in many new settlements established after 1975.

The houses are built on wooden or bamboo piles between one and two metres (6') above the ground and are at least five by seven metres (16' x 23') in size. Usually they are larger. Construction materials include woven bamboo or sawn lumber for floors and walls and grass thatch or bamboo shingle roofing. A kitchen hearth is located inside the house, and an open porch is built on at least one end of the house. A separate rice barn, also built on piles, may be located in the village near the house (Kammu) or on the edge of the village (Lamet). Villages are commonly built near a small stream to provide drinking and washing water, which is often diverted through a bamboo aqueduct to facilitate filling buckets and bathing.

Virtually all Lao Theung groups rely on swidden rice cultivation as the basis of their household economy. Lamet and Kammu prefer glutinous rice, but some other groups prefer to eat ordinary rice. A small field house is almost always built in the fields, and all or part of the family may sleep there for days during the farming season rather than walk back to the village every day.

Swidden rice seldom yields as much as paddy fields, and the labor needed to keep weeds under control is the major constraint to expanding the area farmed. Corn, cassava, and wild tubers are thus important components of the diet to supplement a frequently inadequate rice supply. As a consequence of low rice yields, Lao Theung are generally considered to be the poorest of the three ethnic groupings in Laos. Men often come to towns to work as coolies.

In addition to farming, Lao Theung engage in hunting and gathering in the forests surrounding the village. Men shoot or trap small game and occasionally a wild pig or deer. Both women and men regularly collect bamboo and rattan sprouts, wild vegetables, mushrooms, tubers, and medicinal plants, the latter marketed by women. Fishing is common for some groups but seldom practiced by others, perhaps as a consequence of living in an upland environment distant from large streams.

Damrong Tayanin, an anthropologist of Kammu origin, has described a pattern of land tenure for the Kammu in which households own a large number of separate fields that are farmed over a twelve- to fifteen-year rotation; other households recognize these ownership rights. The claimed fields are divided among the offspring of each generation. However, no other studies mention any Lao Theung group respecting permanent rights to swidden fields. In all cases, fields that are cleared and farmed are allowed to revert to fallow after a year or two. Depending on the population-to-land balance, these fields might be allowed to lie fallow for three to over fifteen years before being cleared again. After each harvest, individual households select the fields they will clear and farm the following year. Sometimes this choice is an individual decision, but sometimes a group of households cooperates to clear and fence a single large area, which is then divided. Or a village decides which area to clear and divide among all the families in the village. Once a field is abandoned, anyone may clear it and farm. Fallow periods shorter than five to seven years lead to gradual degeneration of the swidden system, however, because they do not allow adequate regrowth of vegetation to restore the soil fertility.

Virtually all Lao Theung groups are patrilineal. Kammu and Lamet households average between six and seven persons but may be as large as twelve or fourteen persons. The ideal household consists of parents and children, wives of married sons, and grandchildren. Married sons eventually establish separate households, but a family might be temporarily augmented by a son- in-law who must live and work with the bride's parents for several years in partial payment of the bride-price. The Kammu and Lamet have eight and seven totemic clans, respectively, which provide a basis for social organization and the regulation of marriage. For the Lamet, the clans are exogamous, and each village contains at least two clans, thus providing the possibility of marriage exchanges. Kammu group the clans according to three categories—quadruped, bird, or plant—depending on the clan's totem. The totem is a plant or animal that was instrumental in either saving or killing the legendary clan ancestor. One must marry someone from another clan, and more particularly, men should marry real or classificatory mother's brothers' daughters. Each group of clans (for example, quadruped) always gives brides to one of the others (for example, bird) and receives brides from the third (for example, plants) in a circular relationship. Thus a village must have all three clan categories represented for marriage exchanges to proceed.

Lamet clans help in establishing relationships between persons both inside and outside a village. In the village, members of the same clan are likely to develop cooperative relationships in farming, and a man traveling outside his village might seek out fellow clan members when arriving in another village. For the Kammu, however, clan membership appears relevant only for facilitating interhousehold cooperation and for regulating marriage relationships within a village. Should a family move to another village, they may change their clan membership in order to fit into the three-group marriage exchange circle.

Marriage choices are made by the groom and bride. Once a couple agrees to marry, their parents negotiate a bride-price. Among the Lamet, the bride's family also sends a dowry. Because there are few opportunities to acquire significant wealth in villages, Kammu and Lamet young men have frequently migrated to towns or to Thailand since the 1920s to work for several years until they acquire the funds needed for a bride-price. Among the Lamet, unmarried adolescent males sleep in the communal men's house, although they work with their families during the day.

Polygyny traditionally has been allowed, but it is rare, because few men can afford a second wife. Whereas a Lamet man may marry two sisters, this practice is prohibited among the Kammu; a widow may marry her husband's brother in either culture. If he chooses not to marry her, however, the brother is still responsible for her support. Initial residence after marriage is usually patrilocal, but if the groom is unable to pay the full agreed-upon bride-price, he may be obligated to live and work in his in-laws's household for several years in lieu of the bride-price. Upon the parents' death, the sons divide items of value and, according to Damrong, rights to swidden fields and fallows. Material possessions are generally limited and include—not much more than livestock, farm and household equipment, or perhaps a few silver coins—used in traditional dress—or ingots. Wooden and bronze drums were important symbols of Lamet and Kammu household wealth in the past, but most appear to have been lost or sold during the Indochina wars.

Gender role differentiation in both farming and household activities is considerably greater among the Lao Theung than among the Lao Loum. Men are primarily responsible for clearing and burning swidden fields, although women may assist in clearing the smaller brush. Men punch holes for seed and the women follow, dropping and covering the seed with topsoil. Both sexes weed the fields, but the women are primarily responsible for this time- consuming task. Harvest is a joint activity. In the house, women cook, care for children, husk rice, cut firewood, and haul water. Women also gather roots, shoots, and other wild vegetative products. Men weave baskets, repair farm tools, and hunt small game. Men are also more likely than women to manage household finances and engage in trade, typically selling livestock and collected forest products or scrap metal from the war in exchange for rice. Izikowitz reports a significant trade of surplus rice by the Lamet and Kammu to neighboring lowland Lao villages in exchange for salt and metal implements in the 1920s and 1930s but notes rice sales were declining because of competition from other producers. Since at least the 1970s, few Lao Theung produce any surplus rice. Women may sell vegetables, chickens, or occasionally handicrafts locally but do not have the important market role of lowland Lao women. Where villages have access to primary schools, both boys and girls attend for a few years, but girls are much more likely to drop out before boys.

As in all villages in Laos, village governance is managed by an elected administrative committee consisting of a president and several other members in charge of economic affairs, self-defense, agriculture, and so on. Traditionally, the village has a chief who is the intermediary between the village and the national government. Important decisions are made by elders, who in the absence of a written script memorize agreements among village members.

Both Kammu and Lamet villages have a ritual leader (lkuun in Kammu, xemia in Lamet) who officiates at important spirit rituals that affect the entire village. This position is hereditary in the male line. Kammu and Lamet, as most Lao Theung, are animists and are respected by their lowland neighbors as being especially proficient in protecting against or propitiating spirits that may cause illness or accidents. Ancestral spirits are an important aspect of household religious and safety rituals, but above the grandparents' generation they are generalized, and the spirits of specific persons are not worshiped. Kammu and Lamet revere rather than fear the spirits of their ancestors, who protect the household and village against harm as long as they are respected and are offered sacrifices. Rituals are also performed at the start of any important undertaking, for example, at the beginning of rice planting or building a house. Taboos restrict certain activities; for example, Lamet cannot make or repair tools inside the family house but do this work in the communal men's house.

Lao Theung are socially, economically, and politically the most marginal group of the three ethnic classes. During the Second Indochina War, many Lao Theung supported the Neo Lao Hak Xat (Lao Patriotic Front—LPF; see Glossary), the political party of the Pathet Lao—or actively fought with the Pathet Lao. Ethnic differences and resentments against lowland Lao dominance likely stimulated some of this support, as did effective Pathet Lao recruitment activities in the remote eastern areas populated principally by Lao Theung groups. During the years immediately after 1975, Lao Theung cadre gained numerous mid-level positions in the new government, but later many were replaced by lowland Lao with greater technical training and experience. Provincial and district officials are more likely to be Lao Theung in provinces with pronounced minority populations, and geographical isolation and poor education are still barriers to the integration of all Lao minorities in national affairs. The traditional subsistence swidden agricultural societies of the Lao Theung, which involved little trade with other groups, led to a marginal economic existence for many villages in the 1990s. Numerous individual Lao Theung have adopted lowland behavioral patterns and successfully pass as lowland Lao, but prejudicial attitudes attributed to many lowland Lao continue to affect social and economic opportunities for many Lao Theung villages.

Upland Lao society
Lao Sung (Laotian for "the mountain top"), include six ethnic groups of which the Hmong, Akha, and Mien (Yao) are the most numerous. As of 1993, the Hmong numbered over 200,000, with settlements throughout the uplands of northern Laos. About the same number of Hmong live in northern Vietnam, and approximately 90,000 live in Thailand; this number does not include the 30,000 Hmong that were living in Thai refugee camps at the end of 1992. Some 60,000 Akha reside for the most part in Louang Namtha, Phôngsali, and Bokeo provinces. The other upland groups are the Phu Noi, found in Phôngsali and northern Louangphrabang provinces, the Mien (in Bokeo and Louang Namtha provinces), and small populations (fewer than 10,000) of Lahu and Kui located in the far northwest. The 1985 census also classified the 6,500 Hô (Haw)--Chinese originally from Yunnan Province—with the Lao Sung. All these groups have significant populations outside Laos, and the bulk of the ethnographic information available is from studies conducted in neighboring countries.

The Lao Sung are the most recent migrants to Laos, having arrived from the north in a series of migrations beginning in the early nineteenth century. Hmong entered northwestern Vietnam from China prior to 1800, and early settlements in northeastern Laos were reported around the turn of the nineteenth century. Pioneering settlements gradually extended westward, crossing the Mekong around 1890 and reaching Tak in northern Thailand around 1930. Mien migrations, in contrast, seem to have come southeast through Burma and Thailand before reaching Laos. All Lao Sung settlements are located in the north, with only Hmong villages found as far south as Vientiane.

Lao Sung typically live on mountain tops, upland ridges, or hillsides over 1,000 meters in elevation. The name means "the Lao up high." Most groups are considered to be semimigratory; villages are moved to new locations when swidden farming resources in the old locale have been exhausted. Yet some villages have continued for more than 100 years, with individual households moving in or out during this period. Although all Lao Sung traditionally live in the uplands and engage in swidden farming, their housing styles, diet, farming techniques, kinship systems, and social organization vary from one group to another.

The Hmong make up more than two-thirds of the Lao Sung. Hmong villages in Laos, Vietnam, and Thailand have traditionally been found on mountain or ridge tops, with sites selected according to principles of geomancy. Before the 1970s, villages seldom consisted of more than twenty or thirty households. Hmong rely on swidden farming to produce rice, corn, and other crops, but tend to plant a field until the soil was exhausted, rather than only for a year or two before allowing it to lie fallow. Consequently, the fields farmed by a village would gradually become too distant for easy walking, and the village would relocate to another site. The new site might be nearby or might be many kilometers distant.

The Hmong fled China (where they were traditionally paddy rice farmers) to escape persecution and pacification campaigns, gradually migrating through Vietnam and Laos, into Thailand. They adopted swidden farming in these regions by necessity because lowland basins were already settled. Small groups of households would leave an established village to start another village in relatively uninhabited upland areas. In turn, other families moving from older settlements would settle an area that had been vacated, always in search of better farmlands than those that had been left behind. As the population of both Hmong and other neighboring groups increased, it ultimately became impossible to find new unclaimed lands, and the pioneering settlement pattern ended sometime between 1960 and 1975 in western Laos and northern Thailand. Villages in the old settled areas of eastern Laos—Xiangkhoang and Louangphrabang—in many cases have been in one location for more than thirty or fifty years and have grown in size to as many as sixty or eighty households and more than 500 persons.

Hmong houses are constructed directly on the ground, with walls of vertical wooden planks and a gabled roof of thatch or split bamboo. In size they range from about five by seven meters up to ten by fifteen meters for a large extended household. The interior is divided into a kitchen/cooking alcove at one end and several sleeping alcoves at the other, with beds or sleeping benches raised thirty to forty centimeters above the dirt floor. Rice and unhusked corn are usually stored in large woven bamboo baskets inside the house, although a particularly prosperous household may build a separate granary. Furnishings are minimal: several low stools of wood or bamboo, a low table for eating, and kitchen equipment, which includes a large clay stove over which a large wok is placed for cooking ground corn, food scraps, and forest greens for the pigs. Almost every house has a simple altar mounted on one wall for offerings and ceremonies associated with ancestral spirits.

The Hmong swidden farming system is based on white (nonglutinous) rice, supplemented with corn, several kinds of tubers, and a wide variety of vegetables and squash. Rice is the preferred food, but historical evidence indicates that corn was also a major food crop in many locations and continues to be important for Hmong in Thailand in the early 1990s. Most foods are eaten boiled, and meat is only rarely part of the diet. Hmong plant many varieties of crops in different fields as a means of household risk diversification; should one crop fail, another can be counted on to take its place. Hmong also raise pigs and chickens in as large numbers as possible, and buffalo and cattle graze in the surrounding forest and abandoned fields with little care or supervision.

Hmong have traditionally grown opium in small quantities for medicinal and ritual purposes. From the beginning of their colonial presence, the need for revenue prompted the French to encourage expanded opium production for sale to the colonial monopoly and for payment as head taxes. Production, therefore, increased considerably under French rule, and by the 1930s, opium had become an important cash crop for the Hmong and some other Lao Sung groups. Hmong participate in the cash market economy somewhat more than other upland groups. They need to purchase rice or corn to supplement inadequate harvests, to buy cloth, clothing, and household goods, to save for such emergencies as illness or funerals, and to pay bride-price. In the isolated upland settlements favored by the Lao Sung, opium poppies, a cold-season crop, are typically planted in cornfields after the main harvest. Opium, a sap extracted from the poppy plant, is almost the only product that combines high value with low bulk and is nonperishable, making it easy to transport. It is thus an ideal crop, providing important insurance for the household against harvest or health crises. The government has officially outlawed opium production, but, mindful of the critical role it plays in the subsistence upland economy, has concentrated efforts on education and developing alternatives to poppy farming, rather than on stringent enforcement of the ban. It also established a special police counternarcotics unit in August 1992.

Lao Sung farming is not mechanized but depends on household labor and simple tools. The number of workers in a household thus determines how much land can be cleared and farmed each year; the time required for weeding is the main labor constraint on farm size. Corn must be weeded at least twice, and rice usually requires three weedings during the growing season. Peppers, squash, cucumbers, and beans are often interplanted with rice or corn, and separate smaller gardens for taro, arrowroot, cabbage, and so on may be found adjacent to the swiddens or in the village. In long- established villages, fruit trees such as pears and peaches are planted around the houses.

In response to increasing population pressure in the uplands, as well as to government discouragement of swidden farming, some Hmong households or villages are in the process of developing small rice paddies in narrow upland valleys or relocating to lower elevations where, after two centuries as swidden farmers, they are learning paddy technology, how to train draft buffalo, and how to identify seed varieties. This same process is also occurring with other Lao Sung groups to varying degrees in the early 1990s as it had under the RLG.

Hmong households traditionally consist of large patrilineal extended families, with the parents, children, and wives and children of married sons all living under the same roof. Households of over twenty persons are not uncommon, although ten to twelve persons are more likely. Older sons, however, may establish separate households with their wives and children after achieving economic independence. By the 1990s, a tendency had developed in Laos for households to be smaller and for each son and his wife to establish a separate household when the next son married. Thus, the household tends toward a stem family pattern consisting of parents and unmarried children, plus perhaps one married son. Following this pattern, the youngest son and his wife frequently inherit the parental house; gifts of silver and cattle are made to the other sons at marriage or when they establish a separate residence. In many cases, the new house is physically quite close to the parents' house.

Hmong reckon kinship patrilineally and identify fifteen or sixteen patrilineal exogamous clans, each tracing their descent back to a common mythical ancestor. There are several subdivisions in Hmong society, usually named according to features of traditional dress. The White Hmong, Striped Hmong, and Green Hmong (sometimes called Blue Hmong) are the most numerous. Their languages are somewhat different but mutually comprehensible, and all recognize the same clans. Each village usually has at least two clans represented, although one may be more numerous. Wives almost always live with their husband's family.

Marriage is traditionally arranged by go-betweens who represent the boy's family to the girl's parents. If the union is acceptable, a bride-price is negotiated, typically ranging from three to ten silver bars, worth about US$100 each, a partial artifact from the opium trade. The wedding takes place in two installments, first at the bride's house, followed by a procession to the groom's house where a second ceremony occurs. Sometimes the young man arranges with his friends to "steal" a bride; the young men persuade the girl to come out of her house late at night and abduct her to the house of her suitor. Confronted by the fait accompli, the girl's parents usually accept a considerably lower bride-price than might otherwise be demanded. Although some bride stealing undoubtedly involves actual abductions, it more frequently occurs with the connivance of the girl and is a form of elopement.

As a result of a government directive discouraging excessive expenditures on weddings, some districts with substantial Hmong populations decided in the early 1980s to abolish the institution of bride-price, which had already been administratively limited by the government to between one and three silver bars. In addition, most marriages reportedly occurred by "wife stealing" or elopement, rather than by arrangement. In the past, males had to wait for marriage until they had saved an adequate sum for the bride-price, occasionally until their mid-twenties; with its abolition, they seemed to be marrying earlier. Hmong women typically marry between fourteen and eighteen years of age.

The Hmong practice polygyny, although the government officially discourages the custom. Given the regular need for labor in the swidden fields, an additional wife and children can improve the fortunes of a family by changing the consumer/worker balance in the household and facilitating expansion of cropped areas, particularly the labor-intensive opium crop. Yet the need to pay bride-price limits the numbers of men who can afford a second (or third) wife. Anthropological reports for Hmong in Thailand and Laos in the 1970s suggested that between 20 and 30 percent of marriages were polygynous. However, more recent studies since the mid-1980s indicate a lower rate not exceeding 10 percent of all households. Divorce is possible but discouraged. In the case of marital conflict, elders of the two clans attempt to reconcile the husband and wife, and a hearing is convened before the village headman. If reconciliation is not possible, the wife may return to her family. Disposition of the bride-price and custody of the children depend largely on the circumstances of the divorce and which party initiates the separation.

Hmong gender roles are strongly differentiated. Women are responsible for all household chores, including cooking, grinding corn, husking rice, and child care, in addition to regular farming tasks. Patrilocal residence and strong deference expected toward men and elders of either sex often make the role of daughter-in-law a difficult one. Under the direction of her mother-in-law, the young bride is commonly expected to carry out many of the general household tasks. This subordinate role may be a source of considerable hardship and tension. Farm tasks are the responsibility of both men and women, with some specialization by gender. Only men fell trees in the swidden clearing operation, although both sexes clear the grass and smaller brush; only men are involved in the burning operation. During planting, men punch the holes followed by the women who place and cover the seeds. Both men and women are involved in the weeding process, but it appears that women do more of this task, as well as carry more than half of the harvested grain from the fields to the village. Harvesting and threshing are shared. Women primarily care for such small animals as chickens and pigs, while men are in charge of buffalo, oxen, and horses. Except for the rare household with some paddy fields, the buffalo are not trained but simply turned out to forage most of the year.

As with all Laotian ethnic groups, there is virtually no occupational specialization in Hmong villages. Everyone is first and foremost a subsistence farmer, although some people may have additional specialized skills or social roles.

Hmong are animists, although a small number have converted to Christianity as a result of contact with Protestant and Roman Catholic missionaries. Most believe that spirits are a common cause for illness. Shamans (txiv neeb) who can treat spirit- induced illness are respected and play an important role in the village, often being consulted to tell fortunes. Shamans may be either male or female and are usually "chosen" by the spirits after the former have suffered a long illness. Other men and women may know curing rites but do not enter a trance as a shaman does.

Village stratification is limited but based primarily on clan membership and wealth. Often the clan that founded a village dominates it, either because of numerical majority or because early settlement facilitated access to the better fields. A family's wealth derives primarily from work and good luck. The ability to produce enough rice, or even a little to sell, and a decent opium harvest depend on having enough workers in the family to clear and care for more extensive swidden fields than average. Livestock, particularly buffalo and cattle, are another important source of mobile wealth. This wealth, however, is subject to loss through disease, just as savings of silver, livestock, or cash can be lost almost overnight if the family experiences a serious illness that reduces the workforce at a critical time or that requires the sacrifice of chickens, pigs, or even a buffalo for curing rituals. Proceeds from sales of opium and livestock not immediately consumed are usually converted into silver bars or jewelry for safekeeping.

In contrast to the Buddhist wat or the men's common house in Lao Loum, Kammu, and Lamet villages, there is no building or other central point in a Hmong village. Hmong cultural norms are more individualistic, and the household is more important than the village. Despite greater overall village permanence than in former times, individual households may come and go, usually in search of better opportunities but occasionally because of conflict with relatives or neighbors. The decline of migrating villages has been a gradual process since the 1940s. As opportunities for pioneering settlements have disappeared, households often relocate to be near other clan members or less-distant relatives.

Village governance is usually in the hands of a president and administrative committee, but clan elders have important consultative or advisory roles in all decisions. Interhousehold cooperative relationships occur less often than among the Lao Loum and appear limited to labor exchanges for some farming tasks and assistance at house raisings. Most cooperation takes place among brothers or cousins, and it is primarily close kin who can be relied upon for assistance in the case of family hardship or emergency. Lacking any other resource, Hmong will look for help from any other member of the same clan.

Hmong and other Lao Sung groups have traditionally lived in villages distant from Lao Loum or Lao Theung settlements, although trade in rice, forest products, and other market goods has stimulated contact between the groups. As the population of both Lao Sung and Lao Loum groups increased after the war, Lao Sung expansion of swidden fields affected the watersheds of Lao Loum rice paddies. Northern Lao Loum who cannot produce enough rice on limited paddy fields have also begun to clear swiddens in the middle elevations. For the most part, there has been no overt conflict, and trade and casual contact have continued, but long- standing ethnic prejudice continued to color interethnic relations in these regions of closer contact and competition for land in the early 1990s.

At the same time that roads in remote provinces were being improved and international trade opened in the late 1980s, the Thai government imposed a ban on logging and timber exports following extensive deforestation and catastrophic floods. Thai logging companies quickly turned to Laos as an alternate source of tropical hardwoods. This suddenly increased demand for tropical timber has stimulated additional competition for hitherto unvalued forestland and provoked increased criticism of upland swidden farming groups. Although traditional levels of swidden farming did not cause the same level of land and forest damage as have recent logging activities, government statements increasingly have attributed rapid deforestation to swidden clearing and have envisioned the abolition of all upland swidden cultivation soon after the year 2000. Thus, in the 1990s, there may be more pressure on arable land in the uplands than previously. However, other analysts have noted the great impact of legal and illegal logging, as well as the encroachment of lowland Lao farmers into the uplands since the end of the Second Indochina War. A continuing low-level insurgency against the government, substantially led by Hmong refugees who formerly fought for the RLG, is a further source of official mistrust directed at some Hmong and other minority groups. Government efforts to resettle Hmong and other swidden farming communities in lowland sites are motivated by security concerns—as was the case under the RLG in the 1960s and 1970s—and by competition for timber, but may lead to increased disaffection of the minorities affected.

The pattern of rural life
For Lao Loum, Lao Theung, and Lao Sung, the rhythm of life is strongly tied to the changing seasons and the requirements of farming. For swidden farming villages, the work year begins in January or February when new fields are cleared. This time of the year is also good for hunting and for moving to a new village. Opium farmers harvest the resin between January and March, depending on location and variety of poppy, but otherwise there are few agricultural activities. Swidden fields are burned around March and must be planted in May or June, just before the first rains. From the time the seeds sprout until August, work revolves around the never-ending task of weeding. Hunting and fishing continue, and with the coming of the rains, the forest begins to yield new varieties of wild foods.

For paddy farmers, the agricultural year begins with the first rains, when a small seedbed is plowed and planted. The seedlings grow for a month or so while the remaining fields are plowed and harrowed in preparation for transplanting. Transplanting requires steady work from every able-bodied person over a period of about a month and is one of the main periods of labor exchange in lowland villages.

Swidden farmers begin the corn harvest as early as September, and short-season rice varieties mature soon after the corn. Paddy rice seldom ripens before October, however, and the harvest may continue through early December in some areas, although mid-November is more usual. Even late swidden rice is finished by early November. Harvesting and threshing the rice are the principal activities during the second period of intense work in the farm year. Dry-season rice farmers repeat the same cycle, but vegetables, tobacco, or other cash crops require a more even labor input over the season.

Food availability parallels the seasons. Wild foods and fish are abundant during the rainy season, although the months just before the corn ripens may be difficult if the previous year's harvest was inadequate. Fruit is available during the rainy and cool dry seasons, but becomes scarce, as do most vegetables, from March through May. Hmong and Mien celebrate their new year in December or January, when the harvest is complete but before the time to clear new fields. Lowland Lao celebrate their new year on 15 April also shortly before the start of the farming year. The harvest is marked by the That Luang festival, on the full moon of the twelfth lunar month, which falls in late November or early December.

Because most roads are in poor condition, travel in the rainy season is generally difficult, and villagers tend to stay close to home, because of farmwork as well as the ever-present mud. The dry season brings easier land travel and the free time it allows. Since the late 1980s, a few rural villagers have begun to travel to regional population centers in search of temporary wage employment, often in construction.

Urban society
With a population of somewhat over 250,000 in 1985, Vientiane is the only city of any size in Laos. Three provincial capitals have populations of more than 20,000—Louangphrabang with 20,000, Savannakhét with 109,000, and Pakxé with 50,000. The 1985 census classified 15 percent of the population as "urbanized," but this figure includes the populations of all district centers, most of which are little more than large villages of 2,000 to 3,000 persons. The expanded marketing and commercial opportunities resulting from economic liberalization in 1986 have somewhat stimulated urban growth. Vientiane planners anticipate an annual population expansion of 5.4 percent through the year 2000, and many of the more rural provincial capitals also are growing at a significant rate in the early 1990s.

Urban centers, for the most part, have developed from villages that expanded or grew together around an administrative or trading center. Louangphrabang is the historical capital of the kingdom of Lan Xang, and Vientiane and Pakxé are also centers of earlier kingdoms. Migration of the Lao Loum into the region resulted in the establishment of muang, semi-independent principalities, which sometimes formed a larger state entity but which always preserved a certain autonomy as a result of transportation and communication difficulties. Many of the original districts, have since become district centers, and the word itself is used for this political division. Although district centers rarely had more than a few thousand people as the mid-1990s approached, they serve as secondary administrative posts and marketing centers for the surrounding villages and are the location of the medical clinic and lowersecondary school—grades six through eight—for the vast majority of the rural population.

Population displacement during the Second Indochina War caused growth in some cities—Vientiane, Louangphrabang, and the main lower Mekong Valley towns—but depopulation of centers in the eastern liberated zones. Xiangkhoang was destroyed by bombing in 1969, and Xam Nua and Phôngsali were virtually depopulated. These provincial capitals have been revived since 1975, but their geographic isolation inhibits rapid growth. The capital of Xiangkhoang was relocated twenty kilometers north to the village of Phônsavan. Administrative centers of several districts were also relocated after 1975 in order to make them more central to all villages in the district.

Historically, towns were located along major rivers or in upland valleys and were primarily populated by Lao Loum and small populations of Vietnamese merchants, artisans, and civil servants (imported by the French), as well as by Chinese and Indian traders. Migration of refugees during the Second Indochina War brought an increased minority population, which grew even faster after 1975 because officials of the new regime, many of whom were Lao Theung and Lao Sung, moved into administrative posts in Mekong towns. So many Chinese and Indian merchants left Laos during the war that these groups accounted for only a small portion of the urban population in 1994. Many Vietnamese who were sympathetic to the RLG also fled, although an unknown number of advisers from North Vietnam were posted to Vientiane and other major centers. The Vietnamese population was nevertheless unlikely to exceed a few thousand in any towns other than Vientiane and Savannakhét.

All provincial capitals were centers of marketing, administration, education, and health care, but not of manufacturing because there was virtually no industrial production outside the Vientiane area. As of mid-1994, each capital had at least one upper-secondary school—often the only one in the province—along with specialized technical schools for agriculture, teacher training, or public health. Almost every province capital also had a hospital, but the quality of care and the availability of medicines—although greater than that in villages—were frequently limited.

Everywhere, the basic village character of society is evident. Even in Vientiane, a substantial number of the inhabitants are paddy rice farmers, either as their main occupation or as important supplemental work. Government officials' salaries are inadequate to support a family, and many officials rely on family members to secure their basic rice supply by farming. Cities and towns are also important markets for vegetables and fruit produced in the nearby villages; the trade volume remains small outside of Vientiane but has stimulated the gradually increasing market orientation of rural producers.

Traditional festivals and religious ceremonies are observed in towns much as in villages and are often organized on the basis of a neighborhood, which is typically defined by the boundaries of a formerly separate village. Family life-cycle ceremonies frequently draw guests from outside the neighborhood but rely on close neighbors and relatives to help with food and other preparations, as in a village.

Between 1975 and 1990, urban amenities such as hotels, restaurants, and cinemas were virtually absent outside of Vientiane, Savannakhét, and Louangphrabang. A few towns had government-operated guest houses for official travelers and one or two restaurants with a limited menu. Travelers in most district centers and even some provincial capitals could find a meal only by making arrangements with a family or the caretaker assigned to the guest house. Town markets are also limited in size and number. After the economic reforms of the late 1980s, however, private restaurants and hotels opened in most provincial centers and larger districts. Official travel increased, and more important, Laotian merchants, foreign delegations, and tourists again began to travel within the country.

Sanitation services and utilities are not widespread. As of mid-1994, only a few of the larger towns had municipal water systems, and none had sewerage services. Electrification is a limited but important feature of urban life. Outside of the Vientiane area, Thakhek, Louangphrabang, and Savannakhét, most district centers did not have electricity in the early 1990s. Even in towns, electric power is limited to a few hours a day. Automobile batteries and voltage inverters are widely used as a power source to watch television or listen to a stereo cassette player.

The presence of a foreign diplomatic and aid community has had a significant effect on the economy of Vientiane, both in terms of direct aid and through employment of Laotians by the missions and as domestic help. In response, Vientiane merchants stock imported consumer goods such as electronics, clothing, and food, items purchased by Laotians much more than by foreigners. A once dormant service sector of automobile and truck repair, tailors, barbers, and hairdressers has begun to revive. Patrons at restaurants and the six disco establishments are also predominantly Laotians, reflecting the increased income available to private-sector businessmen and employees of foreign organizations. Foreign assistance in Vientiane during the early years of the LPDR helped to develop several upper-secondary schools and technical-training schools and improve the two main hospitals.

However, Laotian cities failed to attract the rural population, as cities do in other countries, because they offer little obvious economic opportunity and because the rural areas offer the possibility of making a decent living within communities that had not been socially or economically fragmented by the forces of modernization. Further, the government initially had explicitly anti-urban policies. Other towns had experienced less in-migration than Vientiane; this pattern is likely to change if economic opportunities arise in secondary towns or if competition for land and forest resources—or restrictions on access—increase to the point of reducing the rural standard of living. Nevertheless, even if a town does not dominate the region, it affects the lives of people living in the surrounding area. The larger the population of a town, the greater the town's impact on the region. For example, farmers within about fifteen kilometers of Louangphrabang grow vegetables for sale in the town market. In Vientiane, this radius expands to forty kilometers; some village residents commute up to thirty kilometers each way to government or private jobs in the capital. Through these contacts, new ideas and material goods filter into rural areas.

See also
Rural society in Laos

References

Notes

Works cited
Savada, Andrea Matles (editor). A country study: Laos. Library of Congress Federal Research Division (July 1994).